Grant Township is an inactive township in Dallas County, in the U.S. state of Missouri.

Grant Township was established in 1868, taking the name of Ulysses S. Grant, a general in the Civil War, and afterward President of the United States.

References

Townships in Missouri
Townships in Dallas County, Missouri